Rajendra Singh Pawar (Padma Bhushan awardee) is an Indian entrepreneur, Chairman and Co-Founder of NIIT Limited, established in 1981. He also founded NIIT University, a not-for-profit university in Neemrana, Rajasthan, in 2009.

Early life and Education
Pawar was born in Jammu on March 19, 1951. He studied at The Scindia School, Gwalior. He graduated with B.Tech in Electrical Engineering from the Indian Institute of Technology, Delhi in 1972. Pawar has received the ‘Madhav Award’ from The Scindia School in 1999 and the Distinguished Alumnus Award at IIT in 1995. In 2005, he was rewarded with an Honorary Doctoral Degree by the Rajiv Gandhi Technical University.

Career
Pawar began his professional career with Larsen & Toubro Limited as a Graduate Engineer Trainee in June 1972.

He then moved on to DCM where he served for 4 years followed by 5 years in Hindustan Computers Limited, before he established NIIT in 1981.

Pawar also founded NIIT Technologies, an IT firm in 1992. Assessed at SEI-CMMi Level 5, NIIT Technologies offers software services to organizations in travel, transportation, manufacturing/distribution, financial services, healthcare, and Government sectors. 
He has also established the not-for-profit NIIT University in Neemrana, Rajasthan in 2009

Nation Development
Pawar has been a part of Prime Minister Vajpayee’s National Taskforce (1998), and was a member on Prime Minister Manmohan Singh’s National Council on Skill Development (2009-2014). He chaired the NASSCOM Cyber Security Task Force.

Global Advisor

Pawar has been a former member of the International Business Council of the World Economic Forum a member of PIAC (Presidential International Advisory Council) of the Government of South Africa, and also served as an advisor to the Hunan province of China.

Industry Associations
Pawar has served as the chairman of NASSCOM (National Association of Software & Service Companies) in 2011- 2012. As President of MAIT (Manufacturers Association for Information Technology) during 1990-92, he integrated MAIT activities into those of other leading industry associations in India. MAIT played a significant role in shaping IT policies of Government of India, during his tenure.

He is currently Vice Chairman of NCAER (National Council of Applied Economic Research) Governing Body.  He is a fellow of the Computer Society of India and the Institution of Electronics & Telecom Engineers and is Chairman of the Board of Directors of Data Security Council of India.

Academic Boards
Pawar is on the Board of Governors of the Indian School of Business Hyderabad and The Scindia School. Additionally, he has held positions on the boards of IIT Delhi, IIM Bangalore, IIM Udaipur, and Delhi University's University Court.

Social Impact
Pawar has launched the Hole-in-the-Wall education (HiWEL) initiative in 1999 with Dr Sugata Mitra, Chief Scientist emeritus, NIIT, with the aim of making education accessible to the remotest corners in the country. The project has earned the coveted ‘Digital Opportunity Award’ by World Information Technology Services Alliance (WITSA) in 2008.

He has also led NIIT to participate in the ambitious human capacity building project for Bhutan, which was designed to help the country transition into a modern Knowledge Society. The Indian Government assisted project was launched on April 30, 2010 by the Prime Ministers of India and Bhutan, on the side-lines of the SAARC summit in Bhutan. The project was aimed to provide ICT skills to over a quarter of the population of Bhutan, to help them to become confident and empowered citizens of a connected and ICT enabled world.

Pawar promoted the establishment of NIIT Foundation (NF) a not-for-profit education society in 2004 with the vision to support the underprivileged sections of the country through educational initiatives and skill development programs.

Awards and honours

Pawar received the Padma Bhushan in 2011. He was also name 'IT Man of the Year' by IT industry journal, Dataquest in 1998.

Pawar received ‘Lifetime Achievement Award 2022’ from the Federation of Indian Chambers of Commerce & Industry. In recognition of his entrepreneurial innovation in education, he received the 'Lifetime Achievement Award' at Dataquest ICT Awards in August 2020. He was honored as the ‘IT Gem of India’ at INFOCOM 2013, India’s largest IT & Telecom convention, by the ABP Group. Global Business Intelligence firm, Ernst & Young conferred on Pawar its ‘Master Entrepreneur of the Year Award’ in 1999. Pawar has been awarded ‘The Global India Splendor Award’ on the occasion of 60th year of India’s independence, for his work on developing human resource potential. He has also been honored with the Nayudamma Award in 2012.

Personal life
Pawar’s wife, Neeti Pawar, is an active promoter of Indian art & handicrafts. They have three children - son Udai, an IIT physicist turned film maker, and two daughters Urvashi, a psychoanalytic psychotherapist and Unnati, an art historian.

References

Living people
Businesspeople from Madhya Pradesh
People from Gwalior
IIT Delhi alumni
Recipients of the Padma Bhushan in trade and industry
20th-century Indian educational theorists
Founders of universities
Scindia School alumni
1951 births